Neocorus ibidionoides is a species of beetle in the family Cerambycidae. It was described by Jean Guillaume Audinet-Serville in 1834.

References

Neocorini
Beetles described in 1834